Kevin K. Gaines is the inaugural Julian Bond Professor of Civil Rights and Social Justice and a professor of African American history at the University of Virginia. He additionally holds appointments with the Carter G. Woodson Institute for African American and African Studies and the Corcoran Department of History. Gaines’ research centers racial integrationist projects and the relationship between racism, capitalism, patriarchy, and homophobia.

Early life 
Gaines was born and raised in Cleveland, Ohio. He received a bachelor’s degree from Harvard University and a Ph.D. from Brown University through the Department of American Civilization. While at Brown, he became the volunteer director of the local campus radio station’s jazz programming, and has since spoken of how jazz has informed his political work as a marker of black cultural identity.

Career 
From 1996-1997, Gaines served as a National Humanities Center fellow, during which time he published several essays as well as a monograph entitled "African American Expatriates in Nkrumah's Ghana, 1957-1966."

From 1997-1999, Gaines was an associate professor of history and African American studies at the University of Texas at Austin.

In 1997, Gaines was awarded the John Hope Franklin Publication Prize from the American Studies Association (ASA) for his book Uplifting the Race: Black Leadership, Politics, and Culture in the Twentieth Century, which had originally been written as his graduate dissertation. From 2009-2010, Gaines served as the president of the ASA.

Gaines’ second book, African Americans in Ghana: Black Expatriates and the Civil Rights Era, was selected as  one of Choice’s Outstanding Academic Titles in 2006.

From 2005-2010, he was the director of the Department of Afroamerican and African Studies at the University of Michigan. He was also the Robert Hayden Collegiate Professor of Afroamerican and African Studies.

From 2015-2018, Gaines taught at Cornell University as the W. E. B. Du Bois Professor of Africana Studies and History. He was additionally a member of the Public Voices Fellowship program, a campaign designed to share the work of underrepresented thinkers in academia. Through this fellowship, he published an op-ed in Ebony regarding race relations and student protests on college campuses.

In 2018, Gaines joined the University of Virginia as the college’s first Julian Bond Professor of Civil Rights and Social Justice. While there, he was selected to be part of a renaming committee, dedicated to the discussion and potential renaming of various UVA buildings and memorials that had been named for Confederates, eugenicists, and similar figures.

In 2020, he testified as an expert witness regarding the removal of a statue of Confederate States General Robert E. Lee in Richmond, Virginia, arguing instead for the establishment of a memorial to enslaved people in its place.

Writings

Books
Uplifting the Race: Black Leadership, Politics, and Culture in the Twentieth Century
African Americans in Ghana: Black Expatriates and the Civil Rights Era

Articles
"How Racial Divisions at Colleges Start in a Segregated Society" Ebony March 9, 2016

References

Harvard College alumni
Brown University alumni
University of Texas at Austin faculty
University of Michigan faculty
University of Virginia faculty
Cornell University faculty
Year of birth missing (living people)
Living people